A list of two foot six inch gauge railroads in the United States.

Railroads

Gallery

See also

Narrow-gauge railroads in the United States
Heritage railway
2 ft gauge railroads in the United States
2 ft 6 in gauge railways in the United Kingdom
3 ft gauge railroads in the United States
Large amusement railways
Three foot six inch gauge railways in the United States

References

External links
World-wide 30" Gauge Railways and Railroads